Notice (1)

Michał Łysejko (born 1 June 1990) is a Polish heavy metal drummer. Łysejko has played with such bands as Decapitated, Norden, Sonheillon, Access Denied, Driller, Evilution and Melechesh. He currently plays in Morowe, Night of the World, Pagan Forest, Pleroms Gate, and Strandhogg.

Michał Łysejko is endorsed by Sabian Cymbals, Balbex Drumsticks, Czarcie Kopyto Pedals and Lime Ears Monitors.

Legal issues 
On 9 September 2017, all four members of Decapitated (Lysejko, Waclaw Kiełtyka, Rafał Piotrowski and Hubert Więcek) were arrested in Santa Ana, California after a show, and were charged with first-degree kidnapping in relation to an incident alleged to have happened after the band's show at Spokane, Washington's The Pin on 31 August 2017.

During the alleged incident, two women were held in the band's tour bus against their will. Of the two women, one was able to escape. The other informed police that each member of the band raped her on the bus.

After being extracted to Spokane, each band member was formally charged with rape in October 2017. Lysejko and Wiecek's charges were for third degree rape, while Piotrowski and Kiełtyka were each charged with second degree rape. All members of the band plead not guilty to their respective criminal charges.

Later in October the band was released from jail, with each member paying $100,000 in bail and being required to surrender their passport.

Charges were dropped by prosecutors in January 2018, citing the "well-being of the victim", and the scheduled trial later that month was cancelled. The charges were dropped without prejudice, leaving the possibility of future charges open.

Discography 
 Pleroms Gate – Pass the Gate of Pleroma (EP, 2009) 
 Morowe – Dziwki dwie (2013, Split)
 Night of the World – Drive the Knife Deeper (2013)
 Driller – All Shall Burn (2013)
 Strandhogg – Deadborn Spirit (Limbus Infantum) (EP, 2013)
 Morowe – S (2014)
 Evilution – Race of Hate (EP, 2014) 
 Decapitated – Blood Mantra (2014)
 Decapitated – Anticult (2017)
 Kły - Szczerzenie (2018)

References
  

Polish heavy metal drummers
Male drummers
Living people
1990 births
21st-century drummers
21st-century male musicians